"Nee Nee Na Na Na Na Nu Nu" is a song released in 1958 by Dicky Doo and the Don'ts. Aside from the nonsense syllables of the title, which are repeated three times, it is an instrumental. "Nee Nee Na Na Na Na Nu Nu" reached No. 40 on the Billboard "Top 100 Sides", while reaching No. 42 on Billboards chart of "Best Selling Pop Singles in Stores".

In 1980, a version titled "Ne-Ne Na-Na Na-Na Nu-Nu" was released by Bad Manners, which spent 14 weeks on the UK Singles Chart, reaching No. 28.

References

1958 songs
1958 singles
1980 singles
Swan Records singles
Magnet Records singles
Bad Manners songs